Anghel Mora (the pen name of Mihai Diaconescu ) was a film director, script writer, actor, poet, PR agency director, and folk musician from Romania.

Mora was born May 12, 1949 in Turnu Severin, and died on November 18, 2000 in Bucharest. He was a victim of the neo-communist rioting in Bucharest in 1990, the so-called mineriad. He was married to Maria Malitza (1957-2009), daughter of Mircea Malița, a diplomat and former minister of education of Romania.

Movies directed
Recorduri, lauri, amintiri (1984)
Cununa de lauri (1985)
Imn pentru primăvara țării (1986)
Rezerva la start (1986)
Kilmetrul 36 (1989)
Flori de gheață (1989)

Scripts
Să mori din dragoste de viață (1983)
Rezerva la start (1986)
Kilmetrul 36 (1989)
Flori de gheață (1989)

Actor
Șantaj (1981)
Balanța (1992)

Books
Misivă între anotimpuri (1978), Ed. Cartea Românească
Geometria iluziei (1986), Ed. Cartea Românească
Oglinzile au două fețe, (short stories), Ed. Albatros

References

External links

1949 births
2000 deaths
People from Drobeta-Turnu Severin
Romanian male actors
Romanian film directors
Romanian musicians
Romanian male poets
Romanian screenwriters
20th-century Romanian poets
20th-century Romanian male actors
Male screenwriters
20th-century Romanian male writers
20th-century screenwriters